The Pandan Arang Stadium is a multi-use stadium in the village of Boyolali Regency, Central Java, Indonesia. It is used mostly for football matches and as the home stadium for Persebi Boyolali. The stadium has a capacity of 15,000

References

Boyolali Regency
Sports venues in Indonesia
Football venues in Indonesia
Buildings and structures in Central Java